Plett is a surname of German origin that is common among Russian Mennonites and their descendants. Notable people with the surname include:

Barbara Plett Usher, journalist
Casey Plett, Canadian writer
Danny Plett, musician
Delbert Plett, Canadian lawyer and historian
Don Plett, Canadian senator
Peter Plett, German scientist
Willi Plett, Paraguayan-Canadian hockey player

References

Russian Mennonite surnames